Perović — transliterated as Perovic or Perovich, meaning "son of Pero" — is a Montenegrin, Serbian and Croatian surname. Notable people with the surname include:

 Ana Perović (born 1977), basketball player
 Darko Perović (born 1965), comics artist
 Dragan Perović, alpine skier
 Ivo Perović (1882–1958), politician
 Kosta Perović (born 1985) Serbian basketball player of Montenegrin descent
 Latinka Perović (born 1933), communist politician and historian
 Marko Perović (born 1972), footballer
 Marko Perović (born 1984), footballer
 Miodrag Perović, Montenegrin journalist, businessman, and university professor
 Nenad Perović (born 1993), footballer
 Sandra Perović, Serbian television author, film critic, journalist
 Slavko Perović (born 1934), prominent Serbian and Yugoslav singer
 Slavko Perović (born 1954), Montenegrin politician
 Slavko Perović (footballer) (born 1989), Serbian footballer
 Val Perovic (born 1953), Australian rules footballer
 Vukan Perović (born 1952), footballer

Croatian surnames
Montenegrin surnames
Serbian surnames
Patronymic surnames